HK Brezno is a professional Slovak ice hockey team playing in the Slovak 1. Liga. They play their games at Aréna Brezno in the Slovak town of Brezno. The club was founded in 1935.

Honours

Domestic

Slovak 2. Liga
  3rd place (1): 2016–17

Club names
 HO ŠK Brezno –1935
 ŠK Brezno nad Hronom –1939
 Jednota SD Brezno –1976
 TJ Mostáreň Brezno
 1.MSK VTJ Brezno –1998
 HK Brezno – (2003–present)

References

External links
Official website 
 

Brezno
Ice hockey clubs established in 1935